Rufaa is an ethnic group in Sudan. They speak Sudanese Arabic. The population of this group is at least several hundred thousand. Most persons in this minority are Muslims.

References

Ethnic groups in Sudan